Li Tao (born 15 January 1968) is a Chinese sprinter. He competed in the men's 100 metres at the 1988 Summer Olympics.

References

1968 births
Living people
Athletes (track and field) at the 1988 Summer Olympics
Chinese male sprinters
Olympic athletes of China
Place of birth missing (living people)
Runners from Chongqing